Slick Rock and Slickrock may refer to:

Slick Rock, Colorado, an unincorporated community in San Miguel County
Slick Rock, Kentucky, an unincorporated community in Barren County
Slick Rock Falls, a waterfall in Western North Carolina
Slickrock Trail, near Moab, Utah